The Ballistic Brothers (initially spelt Balistic) were a British based band comprising Ashley Beedle, Rocky & Diesel of X-Press 2 and David Hill (of Nuphonic Records). Specialising in a kind of jazz-influenced funky electronica music, the band released two full length studio albums in the mid-1990s. Darren Rock, Darren House (Rocky & Diesel) and Ashley Beedle were also known as X-Press 2.

Discography

The Balistic Brothers vs. The Eccentric Afros Volume 1

"NYX 2"
"Gangstalene"
"Uschi's Groove"
"And it goes like this"
"MCF 2870"
"Blacker"
"Valley of the Afro Temple"
"Grovers Return"

The Balistic Brothers vs. The Eccentric Afros Volume 2

"Delancey Street ...The Theme"
"Unhooked And Lost"
"Save The Children"
"Hustler (You've Been Had)"
"Jam Jah"
"Divine Fact (Blacker 2)"
"Goodvibes... Goodnight"
"Anti-Gun Movement"

London Hooligan Soul

"Portobello Cafe"
"Come On"	
"Soho Cab Ride"		
"I'll Fly Away"		
"Jah Jah Call You"
"Mark's Lude"	
"I Don't Know" 		
"Sister Song"
"A Beautiful Source" 		
"Steppin into Eden"
"Peckings"	
"Uschi's Lament"

Rude System

Track Listing:
"Tuning Up!" - 6:50
"Soul Catcher" - 6:56
"Marching On" - 6:07
"Shiva's Prelusion" - 0:19
"Shiva's Waltz" - 4:16
"The Conversation" - 4:12
"Future James (Jack)" - 3:44
"Streets Are Real" - 8:13
"Blacker (4 The Good Times)" - 6:09
"Rule of the Bone" - 5:24
"A Love Supreme, Pt. 1: Acknowledgement" - 5:27
"A Love Supreme, Pt. 2: Resolution" - 3:49
"Silent Runnings" - 8:36

References

British electronic music groups